Squirmles (also known as Snoots, Magic Twisty Worms, or Worm on a String) are small, worm-like toys with eyes, a furry body, and a hidden string used to imitate a live worm, sometimes used as a magic trick. A popular toy released in the late 1970s by the Illfelder Importing Company, Squirmles come in a variety of colors and are measured at 8.5 in by 0.5 in. They are typically found in discount stores in the United States. In 2017 they began being referred to mainly as "Worm on a String", and in 2020 as "wormies" or simply "worms".

The original toy came in the colors pink, orange, blue, yellow, green, and purple. Later, new colors were made available, such as red, navy, black, white, multicolored and many more . There are many more colors, now, and bulks such as 100 or even 200 packs of these worms are available.

In late 2019, Squirmles rose in popularity as an Internet meme under the name of “Worm On A String". Often popular on websites such as Tumblr, Amino, Pinterest, TikTok, and Instagram, they have been used in art projects such as jackets, door beads, and earrings. Some multicolored versions consist of colors found on pride flags.

Use in fly fishing

Squirmles have gained a second life as a material used in fly fishing. Re-branded as "Dragon Tails," they can be tied onto a hook and the same properties which made them appear like live worms on land, make them appear lifelike to fish as well.

References

1970s toys
Novelty items